Strong is the sixth studio album from American alternative hip-hop group Arrested Development, released in January 2010. The single 'The World is Changing' charted at No. 9 in Japan.

Track list (U.S. release)

Track list (Japan release)

References

2010 albums
Arrested Development (group) albums
Avex Group albums